The 2008 Washington State Cougars football team represented Washington State University in the 2008 NCAA Division I FBS football season. The team's new head coach was Paul Wulff and home games were played on campus at Martin Stadium in Pullman, Washington. The season was a disaster from the start for WSU, who gave up the most points in a single season in Pac-10 Conference history, allowing more than 60 points on four occasions.

Perhaps the only consolation for the Cougars was winning the Apple Cup. The media joked before the game that it was the "Crapple Cup" and "full of worms", because the Huskies (0–10 at the time) also had a very poor season.

Schedule

Game summaries

Oklahoma State

Oklahoma State Cowboys spoiled new Cougars coach Paul Wulff's debut. Cowboys' Kendall Hunter had a career-best two touchdowns, quarterback Zac Robinson passed for 182 yards and ran for another score. The Cougars' new offense didn't look good against the Cowboys.

The Cowboys had 367 total yards (193 yards passing, 174 rushing) while Washington State had 196 total yards (82 passing and 114 yards rushing)

California

The Cougars were shut out after the first period while the Golden Bears scored at least 10 points each quarter to win the Pac-10 conference opener at Martin Stadium, Washington State's home field. Cal had over 500 yards (112 yards passing and 392 yards on the ground) and allowed only 162 yards (106 yards passing, 56 yards rushing) to the Cougars.

Baylor

Portland State

Oregon

UCLA

Oregon State

USC

Mark Sanchez became the first USC quarterback to throw five touchdown passes in a half as the Trojans dominated.

USC's defense, ranked first in the nation coming in by allowing just 9.4 points per game, held the Cougars scoreless for the first time since 1984, ending a stretch of 280 straight games in which the Cougars had not been shut out. That was the nation's second-longest active streak behind Michigan's 306. For Washington State, it is also the largest shutout loss and largest margin of defeat in school history.

"Our guys had a ball playing football today, from the locker room on out", USC coach Pete Carroll said. "Right from the start, we wanted to find that focus that we really hadn't had yet."

It was the largest shutout victory for USC (5–1, 3–1 Pac-10) since a 69–0 win over Montana in 1931.

"Our intention wasn't to come out and beat these guys by 80 points. Our intention was to come out and play a great football game", star linebacker Rey Maualuga said.

The Cougars have now allowed at least 60 points in four games this year, becoming the first BCS team to allow 60-plus points four times in a season.  Beset by injuries, Washington State has allowed 66, 63, 66 and now 69 in four of their conference losses. The Cougars, whose only win is against Portland State of the Championship Subdivision, have been outscored 385–111 this season. That's on track to break the Pac-10 record for most points allowed in a season, 469 by Oregon State in 1981.

"It's unfortunate for those guys. They are trying to build a program", Carroll said. "It's tough. I don't know what else we could have done.

"It was a little bit uncomfortable to see what was going to happen."

The Trojans outgained Washington State 408–17 in the first half and 625–116 for the game. They led 21–0 less than 11 minutes in. Patrick Turner and Ronald Johnson each caught two of Sanchez's scoring throws, freshman Broderick Green rushed for 121 yards and two touchdowns and C. J. Gable ran for 109 yards and three more scores. Stafon Johnson must have had an off game. He ran for 112 yards but didn't score.

It was the first time USC had three 100-yard rushers in a game since 1977.

Stanford

Arizona

Arizona State

Washington

Hawaii

References

Washington State
Washington State Cougars football seasons
Washington State Cougars football